Nysa was a town in ancient Thrace, in the district between the rivers Strymon and Nestus, which subsequently formed part of ancient Macedonia. It is called Nyssos by Pliny the Elder.

References

Populated places in ancient Macedonia
Populated places in ancient Thrace
Former populated places in Greece
Lost ancient cities and towns